The UK-based Nationwide Building Society had a presence in Ireland since 24 March 2009, offering deposit accounts only. Accounts were available to Irish residents only and did not confer membership of the UK building society. Nationwide UK (Ireland) had a retail outlet in Merrion Row in Dublin city centre, however its business was mostly online, by post or by phone. Amongst the products offered to its customers were UK Sterling savings accounts as well as Euro savings accounts.

It was regulated by the UK Financial Conduct Authority and the Prudential Regulation Authority. It was also a member of the UK Financial Services Compensation Scheme.

Nationwide UK Ireland was not related to the also defunct Irish Nationwide Building Society which was administered as part of the Irish Bank Resolution Corporation until the latter's liquidation in 2013.

Although regulated to trade in Ireland by the Central Bank of Ireland it was not part of the Irish government's bank guarantee scheme, although deposits (up to 85,000GBP) were guaranteed under the UK government's Financial Services Compensation Scheme (FSCS) as it was also regulated by the Bank of England's Prudential Regulation Authority.

Nationwide UK Ireland closed its doors at the end of 2017. Its office at 13 Merrion Row, Dublin 2 closed on 31 May 2017.

References

External links

Nationwide Building Society

Building societies of the Republic of Ireland
Banks established in 2009
Banks disestablished in 2017
2009 establishments in Ireland
2017 disestablishments in Ireland